Zhao Shijian (born 10 March 1955) is a Chinese speed skater. He competed in two events at the 1984 Winter Olympics.

References

1955 births
Living people
Chinese male speed skaters
Olympic speed skaters of China
Speed skaters at the 1984 Winter Olympics
Place of birth missing (living people)
20th-century Chinese people